Out of the Silent Planet is a novel by C. S. Lewis.

Out of the Silent Planet may also refer to:
 "Out of the Silent Planet" (song), a song by Iron Maiden
 Out of the Silent Planet (album), an album by King's X